Mount Brooks is a mountain peak in the central Alaska Range in Denali National Park and Preserve. The  mountain is part of a ridge extending northeastward from the main Denali massif, which includes Pyramid Peak and Mount Silverthrone. The ridge lies between Brooks Glacier and Traleika Glacier, overlooking Muldrow Glacier to the north. The summit is partly covered by ice.

See also
Mountain peaks of Alaska

References

Denali
Mountains of Denali National Park and Preserve